Rolling release, also known as rolling update or continuous delivery, is a concept in software development of frequently delivering updates to applications. This is in contrast to a standard or point release development model which uses software versions that must be reinstalled over the previous version. An example of this difference would be the multiple versions of Ubuntu Linux versus the single and constantly updated version of Arch Linux.

Rolling release
Rolling release development models are one of many types of software release life cycles. Although a rolling release model can be used in the development of any piece or collection of software, it is often seen in use by Linux distributions, notable examples being for instance GNU Guix System, Arch Linux, Gentoo Linux, openSUSE Tumbleweed, PCLinuxOS, Solus, SparkyLinux and Void Linux. Some modern Distributed SQL databases such as YugabyteDB can also support this feature.

A rolling release is typically implemented using small and frequent updates. However, simply having updates does not automatically mean that a piece of software is using a rolling release cycle; for this, the philosophy of developers must be to work with one code branch, versus discrete versions. When the rolling release is employed as the development model, software updates are typically delivered to users by a package manager on the user's personal computer, accessing through the internet a remote software repository (often via a download mirror) stored on an internet file server.

See also 
 Continuous delivery

References 

Software distribution
Software release
Rolling Release Linux distributions